The Wisconsin Badgers men's soccer team is a varsity intercollegiate athletic team of University of Wisconsin–Madison in Madison, Wisconsin, United States. The team is a member of the Big Ten Conference, which is part of the National Collegiate Athletic Association's Division I. Wisconsin's first men's soccer team was fielded in 1977. The team plays its home games at Dan McClimon Memorial Track/Soccer Complex. The Badgers are coached by Neil Jones.

The Badgers' greatest success came during the mid-1990s, where the program won the NCAA championship and Big Ten Conference Men's Soccer Tournament in 1995.  They won their second Big Ten Tournament in 2017. The program has produced professional soccer players including Sam Brotherton and A. J. Cochran.

Roster

Seasons

NCAA tournament results 

Wisconsin have appeared in seven NCAA Tournaments. Their most recent appearance came in 2017.

Rivalries 
Wisconsin has rivalries with the three in-state Division I programs.

 Green Bay Phoenix men's soccer: the two program compete for the Chancellor's Cup when they meet
 Marquette Golden Eagles men's soccer
 Milwaukee Panthers men's soccer: the two programs compete for the Governor's Cup when they meet

Governor's Cup

Head coaching history 

 Bill Reddan (1977–1981)
 Jim Launder (1982–1996)
 Kalekeni Banda (1997–2001)
 Jeff Rohrman (2002–2008)
 Todd Yeagley (2009)
 John Trask (2010–2021)
Neil Jones (2022–)

References

External links 
 
 Team Year-by-Year Records (2011)

 
1977 establishments in Wisconsin
Association football clubs established in 1977